The Nette is a 10,36km long river of North Rhine-Westphalia, Germany. It is a right tributary of the river Alme near Harth. During its course it experiences an elevation change of 141 m.

See also
List of rivers of North Rhine-Westphalia

References

Rivers of North Rhine-Westphalia
Rivers of Germany